A narco-submarine (also called a drug sub or narco sub) is a type of custom ocean-going self-propelled typically semi-submersible (sometimes fully-submersible) vessel built for smugglers.

Newer submarines are 'nearly-fully' submersible to be difficult to detect visually, by radar, sonar, or infrared systems. Cargos are typically several tons.

The capabilities of these craft are increasing (some are capable of crossing the Atlantic Ocean); their operating places and circles are widening; and their numbers are growing.

The drug trafficker Laureano Oubiña affirms the existence of a marine cemetery of narco-submarines near the Canary Islands (Spain).

History 
During the 1980s, go-fast boats were the smuggling vessel of choice in many parts of the world, although these vessels could be detected by radar. As radar coverage improved, smugglers developed semi-submersibles to avoid radar detection.

In 1988, an unmanned  submarine was found off Boca Raton, Florida. It was designed to be towed by a boat and submerged by remote control. The sub was empty, but officials and authorities believe it was for smuggling after it was realized the hatch could be opened only from the outside.

2000s 
The U.S. Coast Guard dubbed it Bigfoot because they heard rumors of their existence, but never saw any. In 2006, the U.S. detected three vessels in total, and their best estimate was twenty-five or maybe forty semi-subs departed from South America in 2007. In 2008, authorities spotted ten per month, but only one out of ten was intercepted. In the first six months of 2008, the U.S. Coast Guard and U.S. Navy detected forty-two subs off the coasts of Central America, but few seizures resulted. According to various press-releases, an estimated eighty-five events could potentially bring about 544 tons of cocaine to U.S. customers by the end of 2008. Mexican Navy Special Forces rappelled from a helicopter on to its deck and arrested four smugglers. According to one press-release, the vessel carried 5.3 tons of cocaine; it was towed to Huatulco, Oaxaca, by a Mexican Navy patrol boat. The  steel/fiberglass vessel was detected by a U.S. Navy aircraft as part of Operation Panama Express, and was intercepted by Coast Guard Law Enforcement Detachment 402 aboard USS McInerney. Few other submarines were seized because their crews scuttled them upon interception.

In 2009, the U.S. detected "as many as sixty" submarine related events, and calculated they were moving as much as a ton of cocaine daily. In the same year, three submarines were seized on the shores of the Pacific coast, loaded with 1.5 tons of cocaine. The Colombian navy had intercepted or discovered thirty-three submarines by 2009.

2010s 
After the November 5, 2010 arrest of Harold Mauricio Poveda, a key Mexican–Colombian link, exigent interrogation methods revealed FARC (the Revolutionary Armed Forces of Colombia) were behind the construction of submarines and were collaborating with the Sinaloa Cartel to fund their activities.

In 2012, United States Coast Guard officials expressed concerns such vessels could potentially be used for terrorism.

In 2016, the U.S. Coast Guard seized a semi-submersible in international waters about 300 miles west of Panama, carrying about 6 tons of cocaine with a street value of about $200 million to U.S. customers.

In 2017, the U.S. Coast Guard detained a semi-submersible off the coast of Texas carrying  of cocaine, and on 13 November the US Coast Guard located and seized another one off the coast of Panama.

In 2019, Spanish authorities apprehended a 20 m semi-submersible off Galicia, containing 3,000 kg of cocaine, in the first known incident of a submarine crossing the Atlantic Ocean. Operation Black Tide: The Suicidal Journey, a book from author Javier Romero, is a detailed narrative of the enterprise. Amazon Prime Video has made Romero's book into both a television documentary account of the voyage and a drama serial, released in February and March 2022.

A submarine was captured by the Peruvian Navy on 8 December 2019 carrying over 2,000 kg of cocaine off of the coast of the Department of Piura.

2020s
According to a press-release, on November 5, 2020, a submarine was seized in Colombia. A further interception was made in October 2021 by the Ecuadorian naval training ship the Guayas in the Pacific Ocean.

Types of vessels
Costing up to two million dollars each to construct, submarines can move enough cocaine in a single trip to generate more than US$100 million in illicit proceeds for the traffickers.

Semi-submersible 

Colombia's Pacific coastline is filled with thick jungles and waterways, which can be used as clandestine shipyards. A Colombian Navy Commander stated that it is most striking to notice the logistical capacity required of these criminals in order to take all the material into the heart of the jungle, including heavy equipment such as propulsion gear and generators. Sometimes they are put together in pieces and then reassembled in other locations under the jungle canopy, in camps outfitted with sleeping quarters for workers. The narco-submarines can cost about $2 million USD and take upward of a year to build. Despite the costs, some of the craft are intended for one-time use, being abandoned at sea after a successful delivery, given that their cargoes carry a street value of up to $400 million. On other seized craft however, officials found zinc bars used as sacrificial anodes, reducing corrosion on metal parts exposed to seawater. As corrosion would not be a concern on a single trip but is a factor influencing long-term durability, this is a clear indication that multiple use was intended. This, in turn, opens up the question of any illicit return cargo, like weapons, that they might carry back to Colombia.

The design and manufacturing techniques employed in their construction have improved over time: the boats have become faster, more seaworthy, and of higher capacity than earlier models. They are typically made of fiberglass, powered by a 225–260 kW diesel engine and manned by a crew of four. There is no head (toilet), and accommodation is cramped.

Because much of its structure is fiberglass and it travels barely under the surface, the vessel is nearly impossible to detect via sonar or radar, and very difficult to spot visually. The newer models pipe their exhaust along the bottom of the hull to cool it before venting it, making the boat even less susceptible to infrared detection. They are most easily spotted visually from the air, though even that is difficult as they are camouflaged with blue paint and produce almost no wake. They have ballast tanks to alter the vessel's buoyancy so that they ride low in the water.

Typical characteristics
These are the typical characteristics as stated by the U.S. Joint Interagency Task Force South:
Hull material: wood, fiberglass, or steel
Length 12–24 m
Freeboard 0.5 m
Engines: single or twin diesel
Fuel capacity: 5.6 cubic metres
Range: 3200 kilometers
Speed: 11 km/h or more
Crew: 4
Capacity 4–12 metric tons
Control: human or remote

True submarines 

Narco-submarines were considered by officials to be an oddity until 2000, when Colombian police discovered what was reported to be a half-built 36 m-long true submarine in a warehouse outside Bogotá. The double-hulled steel vessel could have traveled 3,700 kilometers, dived 100 m, and could have carried about 15 tonnes of cocaine.

On 3 July 2010 the Ecuadorian authorities seized a fully functional, completely submersible diesel-electric submarine in the jungles bordering Ecuador and Colombia. Ecuadorean authorities seized the vessel before its maiden voyage.

On 14 February 2011 another submarine was seized by the Colombian navy. The 31 m-long fiberglass and Kevlar vessel was found hidden in a jungle area in Timbiquí, in south-western Colombia.

Torpedo 
In August 2005, authorities discovered an unmanned semi-submersible in the Pacific Ocean, a "torpedo-style cargo container" (instead of a full-featured self-propelled ship). These versions use a ballast tank (submersion control) to keep them at about  under water while towed by a fishing vessel. If a patrol ship is spotted, the "torpedo" cargo container is released. While submerged, it automatically releases a buoy concealed as a wooden log so it would be mistaken for marine debris. This log-buoy is equipped with a location transmitter system so coworkers can retrieve the torpedo after the vessel and her crew are released by authorities. If the original vessel was detained or otherwise unable to retrieve the cargo torpedo, the location transmission system also allowed for a second support fishing vessel to retrieve it and then continue the delivery. Such a log-buoy was designed to be used as a last resort; risks are involved with the deployment of said buoy:
 authorities could investigate the sudden appearance of 'marine debris'.
 authorities could notice signals from the buoy's transmission systems, then attempt to locate such signal(s). Therefore, crews in the towing boat operate under the guise of a fishing vessel to avoid suspicion, and avoiding the risks of deploying the log-buoy.

The buoy contains a mechanism to temporarily raise then lower its antenna to transmit its coordinates in encrypted form at irregular intervals. Encrypted codes are used in case of signal interception. Such an encryption could, at a minimum, delay authorities in their attempt to reach the cargo, allowing the narco-traffickers to reach it first. This system evolved from existing buoys used on fishing nets. The buoy designers claim a near 100% shipment delivery success, and state the "torpedo" development is evolving into remote-control using encrypted signals transmitted via satellite.

Operations

Operators 

 Clan del Golfo
 National Liberation Army (ELN)
 Oliver Sinisterra Front
 Revolutionary Armed Forces of Colombia (FARC)
 Sinaloa Cartel

Routes 
Similar to most coastlines, the western Colombian shore is ideal for smuggling. About a third of the two tons of cocaine coming out of Colombia each day leaves via the Pacific coast in semi-submersibles. Homeland Security estimate submarines carry one-third of smuggled maritime goods to United States customers, while claiming they "are clueless" about the rest.

Elsewhere, the U.S. Coast Guard say smugglers are evolving complete logistics:
 fishing vessels along the way warn the crews against patrols, and
 provide them with refreshments, while
 offshore refueling vessels provide unlimited loiter time so smugglers can avoid coastal areas.
For smugglers, the trips are worth the investment—a nine-ton load earns nearly US$200 million wholesale from U.S. customers. Professional fishermen are often at the controls and earn about US$3,000 after completing the excursion.

Submarine smugglers unload their cargo onto fast-boats for the final leg to shore. According to press-releases, none of the submarines are known to unload at North American ports or beaches.

In 2006, a  sub was discovered on the north coast of Spain, but its use is unknown.

In March 2006, according to a press-release, the Calabrian Mafia ('Ndrangheta) ordered a shipment of nine tons of cocaine to be transported by a narco-submarine from Colombia to Italy, but according to a countering press-release, the vessel was discovered during construction.

In 2007, thirteen of the vessels were seized on Colombian dry land or stopped at sea by Colombian or U.S. patrol boats, more than in the previous fourteen years combined, but arrests are rare. After clandestine shipyards are discovered, workmen escape into the jungle. In some instances, semi-subs are towed behind fishing vessels, and are scuttled if detected.

Countermeasures

Surveillance 
In 2007, the U.S. Coast Guard adjusted their underwater acoustic sensors to listen for submarines. According to a 2019 press-release, the U.S. Coast Guard reports they capture 11% of submarines.

Legal 
If various militaries attempt to seize the semi-submersibles in international waters, the crews usually scuttle them. Until 2008, in accordance with international maritime law, the crew was rescued, and, if there was no evidence of wrongdoing, released. To address this loophole, the US Drug Trafficking Vessel Interdiction Act in September 2008 made it a "felony for those who knowingly or intentionally operate or embark in a self-propelled semi-submersible (SPSS) without nationality and that is or ever navigated international waters, with the intent to evade detection". The penalty is a prison term of up to twenty years in the U.S.

The U.S. law does not apply to flagged vessels (i.e., registered with some officially recognized government). The bill grants extraterritorial jurisdiction over international waters and makes it illegal to lack relevant documents. Instead of an anti-narcotics operation turning into a rescue mission after submarines are sunk, the crew can be detained and interrogated using 'exigent methods'.

In 2009, Colombia's Congress passed a law punishing builders of semi-submersible vessels with up to 12 years in prison, or 14 years if they are used to transport drugs.

Security issues related to "torpedo-style cargo containers", semi-submersible vessels, and submarines were reviewed in an August 2012 article in the US publication Homeland Security Affairs.

See also 

 Anti-submarine warfare
 Illegal drug trade
 Illegal drug trade in Colombia
 Merchant submarine
 Mérida Initiative
 Mexican Drug War
 Narco tank
 Plan Colombia
 Prohibition of drugs

References

Further reading
"Ayer Médico, Hoy Narco – El Mexicano que Quizo ser Pablo Escobar" (In Spanish) Author: Miguel Angel Montoya. Publisher: Oveja Negra. . Biography, includes one chapter on the narco-submarine and narco torpedo development.

External links 

Drug Submarines' Culture
Does ‘Smuggler’s Corridor’ Now Extend to South America?
Authorities in Awe of Drug Runners' Jungle-Built, Kevlar-Coated Supersubs
Anatomy of a narco-submarine, El Pais (In Spanish)

Videos
 Colombian traffickers moving drugs in submarines
 US Coast Guard intercepts drug running submarine
 Rep Poe Worried About Drug Running Submarines

Photo gallery
Comprehensive photo gallery and history of narco subs by H. I. Sutton. 
Drug cartels; secret weapon

Merchant submarines
Illegal drug trade techniques
Illegal drug trade in the Americas